Xuezelu station is a station on Line 2 of the Nanjing Metro, located along the north side of Xianlin Avenue in Qixia District. It started operations on 28 May 2010 along with the rest of Line 2.

Piano stairs
In April 2011, Xuezelu station became the first station on the Nanjing Metro to feature a set of "musical stairs" leading up connecting the platform and the concourse levels; since then,  has also installed similar stairs. The stairs were alternatively painted white and black like the keys of a piano, and with the aid of sensors on the adjacent wall, would emit pianistic sounds whenever passengers used the stairs. The utilitarian hope was that this unique feature would help attract passengers away from the adjacent escalators and lower their load. The installation of these stairs caused a large number of Nanjing residents to purposely come to the station to experience them, but also inspired other installations in other mainland Chinese cities. However, the eventual wear and tear on the sensors lead to their uninstalling in December 2012.

Nearby places
 Yadong City
 Nanjing Normal University Xianlin Campus
 Yingtian Vocational College
 Nanjing International School

Video
Looking west from Xuezelu station platform

References

Railway stations in Jiangsu
Nanjing Metro stations
Railway stations in China opened in 2010